Hoekia is a genus of coral barnacles in the family Pyrgomatidae. There are at least four described species in Hoekia.

Species
These species belong to the genus Hoekia:
 Hoekia fornix Ross & Newman, 1995
 Hoekia monticulariae (Gray, 1831)
 Hoekia mortensi Ross & Newman, 1995
 Hoekia philippensis Ross, 2000

References

Barnacles